Liling railway station is a railway station in Liling, Zhuzhou, Hunan, China. It is an intermediate station on the Shanghai–Kunming railway, and the northern terminus of the Liling–Chaling railway.

References 

Railway stations in Hunan